Nasrin Moghanloo (born June 22, 1968) is an Iranian stage, film and television actress.

Filmography 
 Traveler from India
 Mum's Guest
 Without Permission
 Superstar
 Loneliness of Leila
  Mokhtarnameh

References

External links
 

Living people
Iranian film actresses
Iranian stage actresses
Iranian television actresses
People from Tehran
1968 births